Kayrunnera located at  is a remote civil parish of Mootwingee County in far North West New South Wales.
The Geography, of the Parish is mostly a flat, arid landscape. The parish has a Köppen climate classification of BWh (Hot desert).

References

Parishes of Mootwingee County
Far West (New South Wales)